Hamtramck High School is a public high school in Hamtramck, Michigan, United States in Metro Detroit. It is a part of Hamtramck Public Schools.

History
Hamtramck High School was originally located on Wyandotte and Hewitt Streets.

In 1925 655 students attended Hamtramck High School. JoEllen McNergney Vinyard, author of For Faith and Fortune: The Education of Catholic Immigrants in Detroit, 1805-1925, wrote that Hamtramck High had "substantially more students than were in all of Detroit's Polish Catholic high schools combined."

In 1970 the school moved to the former Copernicus Junior Middle School's former building.

Demographics
The demographic breakdown of the 999 students enrolled in 2016-17 was:
Male - 82.0%
Female - 34.0%
Native American/Alaskan - >0.1%
Asian - 35.4%
Black - 15.8%
Hispanic - 0.4%
White - 46.6%
Multiracial - 1.6%

97.9% of the students were eligible for free or reduced-cost lunch. For 2016-17, Hamtramck was a Title I school.

Notable alumni
 Ike Blessitt, former MLB player (Detroit Tigers)
 John Brisker, former NBA player declared legally dead after going missing in Uganda.
 Willie Fleming, former professional Canadian Football League player and member of the Canadian Football Hall of Fame, University of Iowa football player.
 Julius Franks, former American football player, first African-American All-American at Michigan
 Mike Kostiuk, former American football player 
 Rudy Tomjanovich, former player and coach for the Houston Rockets of the NBA
 Cass Michaels, former MLB player (Chicago White Sox, Washington Senators, St. Louis Cardinals, Philadelphia Athletics)
 Bill Nahorodny. MLB former player Chicago White Sox, Seattle Mariners

References
 Vinyard, JoEllen McNergney. For Faith and Fortune: The Education of Catholic Immigrants in Detroit, 1805-1925. University of Illinois Press, January 1, 1998. , 9780252067075.

Notes

External links

 

Educational institutions established in 1930
Public high schools in Michigan
Hamtramck, Michigan
Schools in Wayne County, Michigan
1930 establishments in Michigan